The Istituto Veneto di Scienze, Lettere ed Arti (IVSLA) is an academy of sciences in Venice.

History
The Istituto Veneto was created as the Reale Istituto Nazionale, created by Napoleon for the Kingdom of Italy in 1810.
The current name was given in 1838 by Ferdinand I, Emperor of Austria, when Venetia was under Austrian Government. In 1866, after the annexation of Venetia to Kingdom of Italy, the Istituto Veneto di Scienze, Lettere ed Arti was recognized as one of the most prestigious Italian academies. Since 1838, the activity of Istituto Veneto di Scienze, Lettere ed Arti run uninterruptedly till nowadays.

The first seat of the IVSLA  was Palazzo Ducale then it transferred, in 1893, to Palazzo Loredan. In 1999 it was bought Palazzo Franchetti, and it inaugurated in 2004.

Structure
The institute accounts for 290 fellows, divided in two classes (Class of Sciences and Class of Humanities); each Class is made of fellows (soci effettivi), corresponding fellows (soci corrispondenti), foreign fellows (soci stranieri) and honorary fellows (soci onorari). Fellows are formally appointed by the Ministry of Cultural Affaires after being elected by the Assembly of the soci effettivi.

Activity

The institute's activities include monthly academic meetings (adunanze), where fellows present their studies to be published on the magazine «Atti dell’Istituto Veneto di Scienze, Lettere ed Arti». The institute also regularly promotes meetings, conferences and seminars on Sciences, Humanities and Art.
The institute publishes and prints books (presently the catalogue accounts over 100 titles). Particular attention is devoted to diffusion of culture by audiovisual media, information technology and internet communications.
The institute owns a rich library (over 300.000 volumes) and several archives, including that of Luigi Luzzatti, Italian prime minister in 1911.

Partnership

Italians
Accademia dei Lincei
National Research Council (Italy)
University of Padua
Ca' Foscari University of Venice
Istituto Nazionale di Fisica Nucleare
Società Italiana di Biofisica Pura ed Applicata
Fondazione Federico Zeri
Museo Galileo
Stazione Zoologica
Archivi del Novecento - La memoria in rete (Roma)
Istituto Ellenico di Studi Bizantini e Postbizantini di Venezia
Unione Zoologica Italiana
Istituto per la Ricerca Valutativa sulle Politiche Pubbliche - IRVAPP

Internationals
All European Academies
École Normale Supérieure
École du Louvre, (Paris)
Institut national du patrimoine
Oesterreichische Academie der Wissenschaften
Konrad Lorenz Institute for Ethology
Environmental Systems Science Centre 
International Risk Governance Council di Ginevra - IRGC
Massachusetts Institute of Technology
Duke University
Princeton University
The Italian Academy, Columbia University
Vanderbilt University

Notable members

Class of Sciences
Roberto Ardigò, Giovanni Canestrini, Giuseppe Colombo, Galileo Ferraris, Tullio Levi Civita, Guglielmo Marconi, Angelo Messedaglia, Umberto Nobile, Pietro Paleocapa, Louis Pasteur, Antonio Pacinotti, Gregorio Ricci Curbastro, Giuseppe Jappelli, Quintino Sella.

Class of Humanities
Carlo Anti, Bernard Berenson, Camillo Boito, Vittore Branca, Giosuè Carducci, Fernand Braudel, Antonio Canova, André Chastel, Carlo Cipolla, Benedetto Croce, Francesco De Sanctis, Giacomo Devoto, Francesco Ferrara, Antonio Fogazzaro, Giuseppe Gerola, Virgilio Guidi, Ferdinand Gregorovius, René Huyghe, Frederic C. Lane, Luigi Luzzatti, Francesco Malipiero, Terenzio Mamiani, Alessandro Manzoni, Concetto Marchesi, Luigi Meneghello, Jules Michelet, Marco Minghetti, Pompeo Molmenti, Theodor Mommsen, Costantino Nigra, Pierre de Nolhac, Aldo Palazzeschi, Gaston Palewski, Giovanni Pascoli, Ezra Pound, Leopold von Ranke, Alfred von Reumont, Antonio Rosmini, Luigi Settembrini, Diego Valeri, Pasquale Villari, Giacomo Zanella.

References
 M. Marangoni, Commemorazioni dei soci effettivi 1843-2010, Istituto Veneto di Scienze, Lettere ed Arti, Venezia (2011), 
G. Gullino L'Istituto Veneto di Scienze Lettere ed Arti, dalla rifondazione alla Seconda Guerra Mondiale (1838-1946), Istituto Veneto di Scienze, Lettere ed Arti, Venezia (1996)  1
E. Bassi, R. Pallucchini, A. Franchini Palazzo Loredan e l'Istituto veneto di scienze, lettere ed arti, Istituto Veneto di Scienze, Lettere ed Arti, Venezia (1985)
L. Mezzaroba, Le Medaglie dell'Istituto Veneto di Scienze, Lettere ed Arti, Istituto Veneto di Scienze, Lettere ed Arti, Venezia (2010).

External links 
 

Organizations established in 1838
Culture in Venice
Buildings and structures in Venice
Learned societies of Italy
1838 establishments in the Austrian Empire